Aski Shahr (also Romanized as Askī Shahr; also known as Ask Shahr) is a village in Balghelu Rural District, in the Central District of Ardabil County, Ardabil Province, Iran. At the 2006 census, its population was 70, in 15 families.

References 

Towns and villages in Ardabil County